Olavu Moodidaga is a 1984 Kannada-language film directed by B. Mallesh and produced by Mohan Sharma. The story was written by M. D. Sundar. The film stars Anant Nag, Lakshmi, Ramakrishna  and Leelavathi.

The film's score and  songs were composed by Rajan–Nagendra, whilst the dialogues and lyrics were written by Chi. Udaya Shankar.

Cast 
 Anant Nag 
 Lakshmi
 Ramakrishna 
 Leelavathi
 Musuri Krishnamurthy
 Lohithashwa
 Dinesh
 Sundar Krishna Urs
 Mysore Lokesh
 Shashikala
 Mandeep Roy

Soundtrack 
The music was composed by the Rajan–Nagendra duo, with lyrics by Chi. Udaya Shankar.

References

External links 

 Olavu Moodidaga online

1984 films
1980s Kannada-language films
Indian drama films
Films scored by Rajan–Nagendra
Films directed by B. Mallesh